The King's Royal Hussars (KRH) is a Royal Armoured Corps regiment of the British Army formed in 1992. Based at Tidworth it serves as the armoured regiment of the 12th Armoured Brigade Combat Team (ABCT). Under Army 2020 Refine, it is intended to exchange its Challenger 2 tanks for Ajax vehicles.

History

The regiment was formed on 4 December 1992 by the amalgamation of two other regiments:
The Royal Hussars (Prince of Wales's Own) (an amalgamation of the 10th Royal Hussars (Prince of Wales's Own) and 11th Hussars (Prince Albert's Own)) and 
14th/20th King's Hussars (an amalgamation of the 14th King's Hussars and the 20th Hussars).

The regiment was based at York Barracks in Münster at the time of amalgamation from where it deployed units to Northern Ireland on Operation Banner in June 1994 and to Bosnia and Herzegovina in January 1996: it spent its time as part of 2nd Canadian Multi National Brigade and was awarded the Canadian Forces' Unit Commendation - the first time that this had been awarded to a foreign unit.

The regiment deployed units to Bosnia and Herzegovina again in June 1997 and to both Bosnia and Herzegovina and Kosovo in autumn 1999. The regiment returned to Aliwal Barracks at Tidworth Camp in March 2000 from where it deployed units to Northern Ireland in October 2002; it also deployed units to Iraq on Operation Telic 1 in June 2003, Operation Telic 6 in May 2005 and Operation Telic 10 in June 2007. The regiment also deployed on Operation Herrick 7 in September 2007 and Operation Herrick 16 in April 2012.

Organisation

The regiment currently serves in the armoured role, equipped with Challenger 2 tanks, and is based in Tidworth, Wiltshire. The regiment is organised into a total of five squadrons, each of which perpetuates the title of one of its antecedent regiments:
A Squadron (The Twentieth Hussar Squadron)
B Squadron (The Fourteenth Hussar Squadron)
C Squadron (The Eleventh Hussar Squadron)
D Squadron (The Tenth Hussar Squadron)
HQ Squadron

C Squadron traditionally is the senior squadron of the King's Royal Hussars in perpetuation of the honour accorded to C Squadron the 11th Hussars in Egypt.

Uniform

Crimson trousers

The regiment wears crimson trousers when in full dress, No. 1 dress or No. 2 dress, and (for officers and NCOs) mess dress. They may also be worn in shirt sleeve order by officers, including those on secondment to the regiment from other units. This distinctive feature, which is unique in the British Army, derives from the honour accorded to the 11th Hussars by Prince Albert, the future consort of Queen Victoria.  The regiment, then based at Canterbury, formed the escort for the Prince from his arrival at Dover en route to his wedding in London.  The Prince was so impressed with the bearing and turnout of the troops that he ordered that they should henceforth wear his livery as a mark of distinction.

Brown beret
The regiment wears a unique brown beret.  This practice began when the 11th Hussars were mechanized in 1928.  It was found that the traditional forage cap with a peak was inconvenient when peering through an armoured vehicle gunsight, so it was decided to adopt a beret.  It is believed that the brown colour was selected by the then quartermaster's wife as a practical choice for working with oily vehicles, rather than horses.  The beret was originally worn without a cap badge but with a broad crimson band. On almagamation with the 10th Hussars PWO (the senior regiment of the two), who had a red patch behind their cap badge, it was agreed in discussions between representatives of both regiments (10th and 11th) to retain the patch but the colour was changed to crimson to represent the crimson band.   Since 2003 the Royal Wessex Yeomanry has also worn the brown beret.

The Gurkha link

The regiment wear the crossed kukri of the Gurkhas as an arm badge. This relates back to 1945 when C Squadron, 14th/20th King's Hussars assaulted the town of Medicina in Italy alongside the 2nd Battalion, 6th Gurkha Rifles, inflicting heavy losses on the German defenders despite being outnumbered. In commemoration of this action the 14th/20th King's Hussars adopted the crossed kukri badge, a tradition maintained by the regiment.

The Emperor
During the Battle of Vitoria in June 1813, the 14th Light Dragoons captured from a French baggage train, a silver chamber pot belonging to King Joseph Bonaparte which he had received from his brother, Emperor Napoleon. The regiment gained the regimental nickname of "The Emperor's Chambermaids" and retained the chamber pot as a loving cup known as "The Emperor". The King's Royal Hussars, as the successor to the 14th Light Dragoons, still retain "The Emperor", and their officers drink from it on mess nights.

Regimental museum
"HorsePower: The Museum of the King's Royal Hussars" is the regiment's museum and forms part of Winchester's Military Museums in Winchester, Hampshire.

Colonel-in-Chief
1992:	Princess Anne, The Princess Royal, KG, KT, GCVO

Regimental Colonels
Colonels of the Regiment have been:
1992–1997: Maj-Gen. John Peter William Friedberger, CB, CBE (ex Royal Hussars)
1997–2002: Brig. Euan Charles Wortham Morrison, OBE
2002–2007: Brig. Christopher Keith Price, CBE 
2007–2012: Colonel David Woodd
2012–2017: General Sir Richard Shirreff, KCB CBE
2017–2022: General Sir Adrian Bradshaw, KCB OBE DL
2022–present: Brigadier J. Nicholas N. Orr

Commanding Officers 
Commanding Officers have included:

 1992–1994: Lieutenant Colonel David J. B. Woodd
 1994–1996: Lt Col Alexander Richard David Shirreff
 1996–1998: Lt Col Adrian John Bradshaw
 1998–2001: Lt Col Jonathan J. Powe
 2001–2003: Lt Col Timothy C. Allen
 2003–2005: Lt Col S. Toby W. Bridge
 2005–2008: Lt Col J. Nicholas N. Orr
 2008–2010: Lt Col Giles R. M. Harrison
 2010–2013: Lt Col Alexander T. L. Potts
 2013–2015: Lt Col Justin J. Kingsford
 2015–2017: Lt Col James D. H. Porter
 2017–2020: Lt Col Angus M. A. Tilney MC
 2020-Present: Lt Col Will D. Hodgkinson MBE

Notable officers
Alexander Windsor, Earl of Ulster
Jordan Wylie
Jamie Snowden

Lineage

Alliances
 - 1st Hussars
 - 10th Light Horse
 - 2nd/14th Light Horse Regiment (Queensland Mounted Infantry)
 - 4th/19th Prince of Wales's Light Horse
 - Queen Alexandra's Mounted Rifles
 - The Guides Cavalry (Frontier Force)
 - Zambia Armoured Car Regiment
 - HMS Dauntless
 - IX(B) Squadron 
 – 5e Régiment de Dragons

Affiliated Yeomanry
The Royal Wiltshire Yeomanry (Prince of Wales's Own)
The Royal Gloucestershire Hussars
The Duke of Lancaster's Own Yeomanry

Order of precedence

References

External links

Official site
British Army Locations from 1945 British Army Locations from 1945
The King's Royal Hussars Association The King's Royal Hussars Association
Noahs Arc - The Club of the 14th/20th King's Hussars Noahs Arc - The Club of the 14th/20th King's Hussars

Cavalry regiments of the British Army
Hussar regiments of the British Army
Military units and formations established in 1992
Royal Armoured Corps